The 2018–19 Club Necaxa season is the 94th season in the football club's history and the 8th consecutive season in the top flight of Mexican football since the team most recent promotion to Liga MX.

Coaching staff

Players

Squad information

Players and squad numbers last updated on 6 January 2019.Note: Flags indicate national team as has been defined under FIFA eligibility rules. Players may hold more than one non-FIFA nationality.

Competitions

Overview

Torneo Apertura

League table

Results summary

Result round by round

Matches

Apertura Copa MX

Group stage

Round of 16

Torneo Clausura

League table

Results summary

Result round by round

Matches

Clausura Copa MX

Statistics

Goals

Clean sheets

References

External links

Mexican football clubs 2018–19 season
Club Necaxa seasons